Purvi or Poorvi is a raga in Hindustani classical music that exemplifies its own thaat, the Poorvi thaat. Purvi has a deeply serious, quiet and somewhat mystical character. It is uncommon in performances nowadays.

Aroha & Avaroha 

Arohana: 

Thus: C D-flat E F-sharp G A-flat B C+

In German: C Des E Fis G Aes H C+

In Arohana, S and P are often avoided, specially in fast taans.

Avarohana:

Vadi & Samavadi 

Vadi : Ga

Samvadi : Ni

Pakad or Chalan

Organization & Relationships

Thaat: Purvi is the main raga of Purvi Thaat.

Samay (Time) 

4th Prahar of the day (3pm-6pm)

Film Songs

Language: Tamil

Related Ragas 

Puriya Dhanashree

Rasa
Raga-Kalpadruma: Charming and beautiful, scantily dressed, lotus-eyed Puravi appears at the end of the day. Idle and sleepy, she suffers from the pangs of separation and dreams only of her lover.

Cattvarimsacchata-Raga-Nirupanam: Master of archery, seated on an elephant and dressed in white, Purvika has a splendid body and is served by all the different varnas.

Raga-Sagara: I remember Purvika dressed in a garment woven with threads of gold. Fair and charming like the moon, she holds a cup of wine and a parrot in her hands and she is served by woman who are graceful and lively like the young deer. The head of her lover rests in her lap.

Historical Information 
Poorvi is an old traditional raga, which originated in the eastern part of India. Its ancient precursor Purvagauda had a similar scale to modern Bhairav (S r G m P d N). Poorvi itself does not appear in the literature before the 16th century. It is one of the 14 original composition of the legend Tansen.

References

Literature

.

.

.

.

.

.

External links 
 Detailed analysis by Rajan Parrikar of Purvi/Poorvi and associated ragas along with audio samples.
 More details about raga Poorvi

Hindustani ragas